One Codex Gothanus (simply meaning a codex in the library at Gotha, Germany) is an early ninth-century codex written at Fulda, that was commissioned by Eberhard of Friuli, probably about 830, from the scholar Lupus Servatus, abbot of Ferrières. The original is lost, but Codex Gothanus is one of two extant copies. The manuscript contains laws useful in the administration of Friuli, preceded by a text of the origins of the Lombards, probably compiled before the death of Pepin of Italy (810). According to Walter Pohl it is written from a Carolingian and Christian perspective, substituting for the Longobardi origin myth concerning Wotan a controlling sense of Providence. The Monumenta Germaniae Historica version (MGH SRL, pp 7-11) calls it Historia Langobardorum Codicis Gothani. The opening and closing of the Codex Gothanus are so different from the Origo Gentis Langobardorum and Paul the Deacon that Thomas Hodgkin, Italy and Her Invaders (vol VI 1880:146, note B) printed them separately rather than attempt to weave them into a coherent whole.
  
Another Codex Gothanus at Gotha contains excerpts of the Strategemata of  Frontinus.

Notes

Lombard books